Calgary-Bhullar-McCall is a provincial electoral district for the Legislative Assembly of Alberta, Canada. It was created in 1971, and was named after Frederick McCall and the McCall Industrial Park. As of the 2010 redistricting, the industrial park is no longer in the boundaries. In December 2021, a bill was passed renaming the constituency to Calgary-Bhullar-McCall in remembrance of late MLA Manmeet Bhullar.

The district includes the neighbourhoods of Castleridge, Falconridge, Martindale, Saddleridge, and Skyview Ranch, and is noted for its high levels of ethnic diversity.

History
The electoral district was created in the 1971 boundary redistribution and was formed out of the north half of Calgary East.

The 2010 boundary redistribution significantly changed the riding. All land west of 36 Street NE was moved out of the district. The Calgary International Airport was moved into Calgary-Mackay-Nose Hill while the McCall Industrial Park was moved into Calgary-Cross. A large chunk of land south of 80 Street NE and east of Falconridge Blvd NE was moved into the new Calgary-Greenway constituency.

Boundary history

Representation history

The electoral district was created in the 1971 boundary redistribution. The first election held in the district that year returned former Calgary Alderman George Ho Lem who ran as a Social Credit candidate. He won a tight race over future MLA and Member of Parliament John Kushner.

The 1975 election would see the riding change hands as Ho Lem would be defeated by Progressive Conservative candidate Andrew Little in a landslide. Little ran for re-election in the 1979 general election and won easily taking over 70% of the popular vote. He retired at dissolution of the assembly in 1982.

The third representative of the riding was returned in the 1982 election. The race that year saw Progressive Conservative candidate Stan Nelson returned with a landslide majority of over 75% of the popular vote and over 17,000 votes. He was re-elected to his second term in 1986 with a substantially reduced number of votes but still with a landslide majority of around 63%. Nelson would win his third term in office in 1989 with just over half the popular vote. He would retire from the Assembly at dissolution in 1993.

McCall would elect Progressive Conservative candidate Harry Sohal in the 1993 election. The race was the first closely contested since 1971. Sohal held the seat with just under 45% of the popular vote. On November 15, 1994, while out jogging, Sohal had a heart attack. He did not survive, and the seat became vacant.

On April 20, 1995 a by-election was held to replace Sohal. The election was another closely contested race with voters returning Progressive Conservative candidate Shiraz Shariff with a plurality of just over 43% of the vote. Shariff won his second term with a large majority in 1997 and was returned to his third term with a majority in 2001.

Shariff's popularity started to slide after 2001. He was nearly defeated by Liberal candidate Darshan Kang in the 2004 election when he lost nearly half of his popular vote from 2001. He won fewer votes with a lower percentage than when he was first elected in the 1995 by-election. The two faced each other in the 2008 election with the reverse result. Shariff was defeated while Kang won his first term in office.

In 2015 New Democratic Party candidate Irfan Sabir was elected, beating the Wildrose Party challenger by fewer than 500 votes. He was re-elected in 2019 with 51.7% of the popular vote.

Legislature results

1971 general election

1975 general election

1979 general election

1982 general election

1986 general election

1989 general election

1993 general election

1995 by-election

1997 general election

2001 general election

2004 general election

2008 general election

2012 general election

2015 general election

2019 general election

Senate nominee results

2004 Senate nominee election district results

Voters had the option of selecting 4 Candidates on the Ballot

2012 Senate nominee election district results

Student Vote results

2004 student election

On November 19, 2004 a Student Vote was conducted at participating Alberta schools to parallel the 2004 Alberta general election results. The vote was designed to educate students and simulate the electoral process for persons who have not yet reached the legal majority. The vote was conducted in 80 of the 83 provincial electoral districts with students voting for actual election candidates. Schools with a large student body that reside in another electoral district had the option to vote for candidates outside of the electoral district then where they were physically located.

2012 election

References

External links
Website of the Legislative Assembly of Alberta
Electoral Divisions Act 2003
Demographics for Calgary McCall
Riding Map for Calgary McCall

Alberta provincial electoral districts
Politics of Calgary